Pultenaea procumbens, commonly known as heathy bush-pea, is a species of flowering plant in the family Fabaceae and is endemic to south-eastern continental Australia. It is a low-lying or spreading shrub with lance-shaped or rhombic leaves and yellow, orange and red flowers.

Description
The edges of the leaves curve strongly downwards and there is a sharp point on the tip.

Taxonomy
Pultenaea procumbens was first formally described in 1825 by Allan Cunningham in Barron Field's Geographical Memoirs on New South Wales. The specific epithet (procumbens) means "procumbent".

Distribution and habitat
Heathy bush-pea grows in forest and heath and is found in New South Wales south from the Nandewar Range through the tablelands and South West Slopes of New South Wales and the Australian Capital Territory to northern and eastern Victoria where it occurs in scattered locations, often on rocky hillsides.

References

Fabales of Australia
Flora of New South Wales
Flora of Victoria (Australia)
Flora of the Australian Capital Territory
procumbens
Plants described in 1825
Taxa named by Allan Cunningham (botanist)